The Daily News Building, also known as The News Building, is a skyscraper at 220 East 42nd Street in the Turtle Bay neighborhood of Midtown Manhattan in New York City. The original building was designed by architects Raymond Hood and John Mead Howells in the Art Deco style, and was erected between 1928 and 1930. A later addition was designed by Harrison & Abramovitz and built between 1957 and 1960.

Its architectural features include a large granite entrance at 42nd Street and an expansive lobby inside. The original structure is an L-shaped building that faces 41st Street to the south, Second Avenue to the east, and 42nd Street to the north, with a longer frontage on 41st Street than on 42nd Street. The annex, along 42nd Street and Second Avenue, gives the present building a rectangular lot.

The Daily News Building was commissioned by Joseph Medill Patterson, the founder of the New York Daily News. The design incorporates a layered massing that contains several setbacks at higher floors. It was Hood's first modern freestanding tower and one of the first large Art Deco buildings in New York City. The Daily News Building was occupied by the Daily News until 1995, after which it was converted to office use. Upon its completion, the Daily News Building received mixed reviews, and many observers described the building as having a utilitarian design. The Daily News Building was made a National Historic Landmark in 1978. It was designated a New York City Landmark in 1981 and its interior was similarly designated in 1998.

Site 
The Daily News Building is at 220 East 42nd Street in East Midtown, on the south side of the street between Third Avenue and Second Avenue. The building site is bounded by 42nd Street to the north, Second Avenue to the east, 41st Street to the south, and a private alley called Kempner Place to the west. The New York City Subway's Grand Central–42nd Street station, the Chrysler Building, and the Socony–Mobil Building are one block west, while Tudor City and the Ford Foundation Building are one block east.

Architecture 
The Daily News Building was designed in the Art Deco style by architects Raymond Hood and John Mead Howells, and was commissioned as the headquarters of the New York Daily News, which at the time was owned by Joseph Medill Patterson. It was among the first skyscrapers to be built without an ornamental crown. This was in contrast to Hood's earlier designs for the Tribune Tower in Chicago and the American Radiator Building in Manhattan. Harrison & Abramovitz designed additions to the building, which were constructed between 1957 and 1960.

Hood designed the building with practical needs in mind, saying that "I do not feel that The News Building is worse looking than some other buildings". Hood wrote that both the owner and architect had agreed that "the most simple and direct way to get an effective exterior" was to colorize its features. The upper floors were designed as lofts separated only by movable partitions. Although Hood was not particularly involved in the design of the office stories, he did design an executive suite for Patterson.

Form 

The massing was influenced by the requirements of the 1916 Zoning Resolution. The 36-story tower, built between 1928 and 1930, is on the northern portion of the site, facing 42nd Street. The original tower contains several setbacks on all four sides. The northern elevation along 42nd Street contains one large setback at the 9th floor. The western elevation has multiple smaller setbacks. The southernmost ten bays of the western elevation are set back at the 9th floor, while the following two bays to the north are set back the same distance above the 15th floor, creating a zigzag effect. The southern elevation contains small setbacks at the 7th and 13th floors, as well as larger setbacks at the 27th floor and above the 36th floor. The eastern elevation does not contain any setbacks, except for the northernmost seven bays, which protrude slightly below the 33rd floor.

The southern portion of the Daily News Building, near 41st Street, is shorter than the tower and formerly served as the printing plant. It was also built in 1928–1930 and initially contained nine stories. An additional five stories were built in the late 1950s, set back from the original structure. An 18-story annex, also built in the late 1950s, runs on the northeastern portion of the plot, facing Second Avenue and 42nd Street.

Facade

Tower 

The facade of the tower is composed of vertical window bays that are separated by "irregularly placed" sections of white brick wall, as well as multicolored brick patterns and red curtains. The spandrel panels between the windows on each story are made of reddish-brown and black brick, laid in a contrasting pattern. The spandrel panels at lower floors contain geometric patterns, while those on upper floors have been simplified into horizontal bars. On floors with setbacks, the panels also contain miniature setbacks. The vertical bands were similar to those used at Patterson's house at 3 East 84th Street, an Art Deco building that Hood had also designed. The tops of the vertical bands terminate abruptly at the setbacks. Hood stated that the window design was largely chosen based on its perceived utility, because the interior space would have needed to be easily divided into offices. However, other critics stated that horizontal strips of windows would have also worked for such a purpose.

At the base of the tower, on the 42nd Street side, is a three-story-tall granite-clad main entrance that takes up the width of five bays. Over the entrance is a carving of the phrase "The News", below which is a large bas-relief with carvings of people and the phrase "He Made So Many of Them", all in capital letters. The latter quotation was attributed to Abraham Lincoln and referenced the "common people" to whom the Daily News was intended. The figure atop the word "He" may be a representation of Lincoln. There are glass pylons on either side of the entrance, which are topped by bronze ornamentation and contain horizontal bronze strips. There are smaller entrances leading to storefronts on either side of the main entrance. Above these storefronts are bronze friezes, which are overlaid at specific intervals by the bottom portions of the white brick walls that are present on the upper stories. The bronze friezes and white brick walls wrap around the building above the first story. A granite inscription from Patterson is present on the western side of the building, and the southern facade of the tower has five loading docks. The entrance was relatively luxurious, since Hood was given a $150,000 budget for the entrance's design.

At the top, the facade is designed so that it appears to have no architectural decorations. The parapet walls extend above the roof to conceal the elevator rooms and the maintenance penthouses on the roof. Hood had initially been uncertain about how to design the top stories. According to one account, architect Frank Lloyd Wright visited Hood and advised him to "just cut the top off". Walter Kilham, who had assisted Hood, later recalled that Wright retracted his suggestion after Kilham confronted Wright.

Other portions 
The facade of the original printing plant on 41st Street is similar to that of the tower, though the bays are grouped in sets of three. Each grouping is separated by wide white-brick piers, while the groupings of windows are internally subdivided by narrower piers. There are friezes above the first and second floors, as well as six loading docks on 41st Street.

The annex's design echoes the vertical stripes of the original design, except with wider stripes. Like the original building, the window bays each contain one window per floor. The facade has light-and-dark-red brick spandrels between the windows on each floor. The piers between each bay are decorated by slightly-projecting white-brick piers with aluminum sheathing. The facade of the printing-plant addition is designed in the same manner.

Lobby 

The lobby of the building includes a circular rotunda with a black glass-domed ceiling near the 42nd Street entrance. Under this ceiling in a stepped pit is a rotating globe that was for many years the world's largest, conceived by the Daily News as a permanent educational science exhibit. Inside the pit is a set of popular science inscriptions. There is also a large compass on the floor, as well as bronze floor etchings within the terrazzo floor, with the names of major cities and their distances from New York City. The walls have nineteen panels designed by J. Henry Weber, which depict maps, weather charts, and clocks from different time zones. The Daily News Building's main elevator lobbies are to the south of the rotunda and contain bronze plaques memorializing Daily News employees who fought in major wars.

The rotunda was inspired by the Glass Pavilion by Bruno Taut, and the recessed center specifically was inspired by the tomb of Napoleon at Les Invalides. Accounts differ on who had the most influence on the lobby's design. According to Daily News historians, Patterson was the first to propose the idea of the lobby. Hood's biographer conversely implied that the idea had not come from Patterson, who had supposedly been skeptical of the design with a globe.

As originally configured, the rotunda was approached from the 42nd Street entrance to the north, as well as from a hallway on the southwest. The hallway led to two banks of elevators to the south, as well as a restaurant, and there were two storefronts flanking the rotunda, one each to the west and east. The elevator lobbies had bronze grilles and other decorations designed by Rene Paul Chambellan in the Art Deco style. There were eighteen glass exhibits, which were part of a scientific and educational display designed by James H. Scarr, a U.S. Weather Bureau meteorologist. The main lobby was so popular among tourists that Hood subsequently opened up a side entrance for Daily News employees. During the expansion, the storefronts on either side of the rotunda were removed and incorporated into the main lobby. The glass showcases of the original lobby were replaced with the wall panels. The city names were changed to reflect new distances and spellings, and a hallway was extended to the entrance on Second Avenue.

History

The Medill family published numerous large newspapers in the United States in the early 20th century, including the Tribune Media conglomerate. One family member, Joseph Medill Patterson, founded the Daily News in 1919 as the United States' first daily tabloid. While the Daily News was not an immediate success, it became the city's largest newspaper by 1925, with a daily circulation of over a million. The Daily News was originally based at 25 City Hall Place in the Civic Center of Lower Manhattan, moving in 1921 to a five-story building nearby at 23 Park Place. By 1927, the latter building had become insufficient for the Daily News operations. The Daily News then started to look for new locations, following the example set by The New York Times and New York Herald, which had previously moved north to Midtown Manhattan from Lower Manhattan. According to the newspaper's research manager Harry Corash, the city's population was centered in Queens, east of Midtown Manhattan across the East River.

Planning and construction

Planning 
The site ultimately chosen was on East 42nd Street; the section east of Grand Central Terminal and Lexington Avenue had yet to be developed, and the Daily News historians called the area "a row of old, assorted, unpretentious structures". Patterson said that the 42nd Street location was ideal, as it was on the same street as Times Square, where the rival Times headquarters were incidentally located. The Daily News bought a  tract of land facing 41st and 42nd streets, between Second and Third Avenues on February 3, 1928, for $2.5 million (equivalent to $ million in ). At the time, the building was being envisioned as a 20-story structure. Eleven days later, the Daily News bought the lots at 41st Street and Second Avenue, which collectively comprised . Patterson selected Hood and Howells as architects for the new building. The pair had previously won the competition to design the Tribune Tower, the headquarters of the Chicago Tribune, which was owned by Patterson's cousin Robert R. McCormick.

Hood had first proposed the Daily News Building as a tower, but Patterson had initially objected. The newspaper magnate did not want the structure to be a monument and initially wanted to build a printing plant with some offices. To get Patterson to acquiesce to the tower plan, Hood framed the plan as an "efficient" business decision and prepared numerous models for possible buildings, concluding that the most efficient one was a skyscraper of between 35 and 40 stories. Hood presented various floor plans to Patterson every week until Patterson acquiesced on the eleventh meeting. One of Hood's plans, which would have set back the tower above the third story to create a rising effect, was rejected by Patterson since it would have eliminated usable office space allowed under the zoning restrictions. Another plan to use a limestone facade was scrapped due to cost, and brick was used instead. Hood subsequently carved a plastic model of the building, creating a tapered design. Hood also created drawings for the proposed building, which depicted a blocky mass with several setbacks.

On the west side of the building was the Commercial High School, which the New York City Board of Education was planning to tear down. The Daily News and the Board of Education each agreed to cede  toward a pedestrian walkway, which would make the Daily News Building freestanding on most of its frontage. However, only the Daily News section of the walkway was built, as the high school remained standing until the late 20th century. The presence of the pedestrian walkway allowed Hood to design the western elevation as a full facade.

Construction

Blueprints were filed with the Manhattan Bureau of Buildings in June 1928; at the time, the building was to be composed of 36 stories and would cost $6.6 million. In addition to the Daily News itself, the new structure would contain Tribune subsidiaries that were related to the paper's function. The ceremonial cornerstone, filled with relics of the Daily News owner Tribune Media, was laid in September 1928. Construction of the steel frame had been finished in August 1929.

By late 1929, the Daily News Building was almost complete. The rival Times described the project as one of several high-rise developments that were "radically changing the old-time conditions" along East 42nd Street. The other developments along that section included the Lincoln Building, Chanin Building, Chrysler Building, and Tudor City. In November 1929, several mechanics were given craftsmanship certificates for "outstanding work" on the Daily News Building's construction; at that point, the Daily News Building was 75 percent rented. The Daily News started moving into the building in mid-1930 and the lobby opened to the public on July 23, 1930.  The building, including the newspaper's new printing presses, had cost $10.7 million.

Daily News use 
The New Yorker observed that the office space at the Daily News Building was designed "at factory prices", which was part of the reason why Patterson had selected Hood as an architect. The lobby was popular and had 625,000 visitors a year by 1938. The Daily News rented out the space in the building that it did not utilize. For example, American Locomotive Company subsidiary Alco Products took space in the structure, as did the Ahrens Publishing Company, the Museum of the Peaceful Arts, and a branch of the National City Bank of New York. In addition, United Press International moved its headquarters to the Daily News Building in 1931. Daily News affiliate WPIX also took space in the building, broadcasting from its  mast until transmission facilities moved to the Empire State Building in 1951. Afterward, PIX-11 studios remained in the building.

In the late 1950s, as part of a $20 million expansion of the Daily News facilities (equivalent to $ million in ), Harrison & Abramovitz were hired to design an expansion to the building and renovate the existing facilities. The additions were to be used by both the Daily News and the building's other occupants. Turner Construction was hired for the annex's construction. Work started in May 1957, and excavation on the annex started later that year. By April 1959, the facade of the annex had been completed. The lobby was also renovated under the guidance of Daily News president Francis Marion Flynn. The new structure was completed in June 1960, and by that August, the expanded building was 90 percent rented. The globe in the lobby was restored in a 61-week project that took place between 1966 and 1967.

By the 1970s, the Daily News and the International Paper Company were the main occupants of the Daily News Building; when the latter moved out in 1978, the vacant space was quickly occupied. By 1981, Tribune Media was attempting to sell the Daily News with limited success. Media and real-estate concerns projected that the building might be worth $150–250 million (equivalent to $– million in ); several commentators suggested that the Daily News could be shuttered to free up office space, though others pointed out that relocating the printing presses would also free up space in the building. Tribune Media sold the Daily News Building to a partnership in December 1982. The La Salle Street Fund held a majority ownership stake in the partnership, while New York News Inc. held the minority stake. As part of the sale, the printing and distribution operations were moved to other facilities in the New York metropolitan area. In 1984, the Daily News removed its printing presses from the building, freeing up  of vacant space that was converted to office space.

Post-Daily News era
The Daily News started looking for new locations after media executive Mortimer Zuckerman bought a stake in the newspaper in 1993. The next year, the Daily News announced it would move its remaining operations within the Daily News Building to a single facility, 450 West 33rd Street in Chelsea, Manhattan. The relocation was motivated by the cost of maintaining several spaces, as well as the fact that the lease was about to expire and the Daily News operations in the building had been downsized since the early 1980s. Further, the Daily News circulation had decreased by two-thirds from its peak in the 1940s, and the number of employees had been reduced more than 85 percent. The Daily News moved out during May 1995. The next year, developer Steve Witkoff bought the Daily News Building and leased most of the building's vacant space, thereby qualifying the building for a $140 million mortgage. The Omnicom Group signed a lease for a majority of the building's space in 1997, making it the building's main tenant.

SL Green Realty bought the Daily News Building in 2003 for $265 million. By January 2019, SL Green considered selling the property, and in October 2019, developer Jacob Chetrit made an offer of $815 million for the building. However, the sale was scrapped in March 2020 after Deutsche Bank withdrew its financing as a result of economic uncertainty during the COVID-19 pandemic. In June 2020, SL Green refinanced the building after having secured a $510 million mortgage; despite the COVID-related financial difficulties, the Daily News Building was almost fully leased . SL Green had sued Chetrit over the cancellation of the sale after Chetrit objected to SL Green's recovery of a $35 million development from an escrow account, but that dispute was resolved in September 2020. SL Green sold a 49 percent ownership stake in the building to Meritz Alternative Investment Management in July 2021 for $790 million.

Tenants
The building contains the former Daily News TV broadcast subsidiary WPIX, channel 11, which later became an affiliate of The CW network. It was also home to WQCD, the smooth jazz station The News had operated as WPIX-FM. The Visiting Nurse Service of New York occupies  in the Daily News Building, and the nonprofit Young Adult Institute takes up  within the building. Other tenants include the United Nations Development Programme, UN Women (which occupies ), and the New York office of public relations firm FleishmanHillard.

Impact 
The Daily News historians wrote in 1971 that "the building did a lot for the paper". The Daily News referred to it as being among Hood's "triumphs", though most of the paper's praise for the building was directed toward the lobby. In 1931, the Daily News published an editorial in rebuttal to modern architecture, saying that the design was focused on the "efficient production of newspapers." At the time of the building's opening, the Daily News praised the lobby as having a state-of-the-art exhibit.

Critical reception 

Architectural critics had mixed opinions of the design. According to English architect Frank Scarlett, who looked at the model of the building, it was one of several contemporary designs that deviated from the eclectic style that had been popular until the early 20th century. The New Yorker, profiling Hood in 1931, said that the Daily News Building was "a distinctly untraditional building" and that Hood's design had been "daringly successful". After Hood's death in 1934, critics and the media described Hood as "utilitarian" in his designs. The New York Times said that the Daily News Building's design made him "practically a complete functionalist". Contemporary modernist architect Harvey Wiley Corbett said in Architectural Forum that the building was a "right about-face [...] from the former eclectic approach". The following year, Architectural Forum lauded the building's exterior for being utilitarian and praised the lobby as "romantic and dramatic".

Other critics viewed the Daily News Building as architecturally lacking. Architectural historian Henry-Russell Hitchcock and architect Philip Johnson perceived the building's design to have sacrificed functionality for effectiveness, saying that the "crisp square termination" on the roof "is a deception". A similar sentiment criticizing the roof was expressed in the New York Herald Tribune obituary of Hood. Architectural critic Royal Cortissoz refused to acknowledge the Daily News Building as an architectural work, to which Hood is said to have replied, "So much the better". Kenneth M. Murchison wrote of the facade, "'Stripes' is Mr. Hood's middle name. He can't get away from them." After the addition of the annex, Paul Goldberger characterized the addition as a "thoughtful but inadequate companion" to the original tower.

Prior to his death, Hood had disregarded the building's "architectural beauty" and "composition", instead focusing on its "effect". One early appraisal of the Daily News Building called the facade "almost nothing but a series of stripes", which the reviewer deemed to be artistic. Another praised the lobby exhibit as being "a genuine contribution to architecture". Later reviews of the building compared it with the contemporary architecture. One guidebook, published in 1952, stated that the building had an "asymmetrical, almost picturesque" shape. Another book in 1960 perceived the tower's freestanding nature as its most appealing quality. Further reviews in the 1970s described the building as having deviated from popular architectural styles of the time, and being a modern skyscraper that was easily distinguishable from "mediocre metal-and-glass neighbors". Architectural writer Eric Nash said in 1999 that "Hood did not romanticize the skyscraper as a carved mountain", unlike contemporaries such as Ralph Thomas Walker or Hugh Ferriss. The rival New York Times called the Daily News Building "one of America's great newspaper buildings", in contrast with its own previous headquarters at 229 West 43rd Street.

Landmark designations
The Daily News Building's exterior was designated a New York City Landmark in 1981, and its first-floor interior was similarly designated in 1998. The New York City Landmarks Preservation Commission, in granting the exterior landmark status, called it "one of the city's major Art Deco presences". It became a National Historic Landmark in 1989. Only the original tower and printing plant are part of the National Historic Landmark and New York City Landmark designations.

Media depictions
Hugh Ferriss drew a rendering of the Daily News Building in 1930. The rendering inspired the design of the fictional Daily Planet headquarters in the Superman franchise. The Daily News building, in fact, was used as the filming location for exterior scenes at the Daily Planet in the 1978 film Superman: The Movie. When the 1977 New York City blackout began on July 13–14, the building's facade was serving as the set for the upcoming release of the film. During the blackout, film crews lent their Klieg lights to Daily News editors so that the following day's issue could be published.

See also

 Art Deco architecture of New York City
 List of New York City Designated Landmarks in Manhattan from 14th to 59th Streets
 List of National Historic Landmarks in New York City
 National Register of Historic Places listings in Manhattan from 14th to 59th Streets

References

Notes

Citations

Sources

External links

 

1929 establishments in New York City
42nd Street (Manhattan)
Art Deco architecture in Manhattan
Art Deco skyscrapers
Buildings and structures on the National Register of Historic Places in Manhattan
Midtown Manhattan
National Historic Landmarks in Manhattan
New York City Designated Landmarks in Manhattan
New York City interior landmarks
Newspaper headquarters in the United States
Office buildings completed in 1929
Second Avenue (Manhattan)
Skyscraper office buildings in Manhattan